Community Bookstore is the name of two bookstores in Brooklyn, New York, both initially owned and operated by husband and wife John Scioli and Susan Scioli.

Community Bookstore in Cobble Hill (formerly of Brooklyn Heights)
Community Bookstore in Park Slope